Alfred Kellett (22 May 1903 – 1970) was an English footballer who played as a centre half for Rochdale. He also played for the reserve teams of Preston North End and Wigan Borough.

References

Rochdale A.F.C. players
Preston North End F.C. players
Wigan Borough F.C. players
Rossendale United F.C. players
Footballers from Preston, Lancashire
English footballers
1903 births
1970 deaths
Association footballers not categorized by position